John Budd Ryan (October 6, 1885 – July 9, 1956) was a Major League Baseball outfielder who played for two seasons. He played for the Cleveland Naps from 1912 to 1913, playing in 166 career games. He managed the Sacramento Senators of the Pacific Coast League from 1924 to 1932 and later managed the Portland Beavers in 1935, the Wenatchee Chiefs in 1946 and 1947 and the Spokane Indians in 1948.

External links

1885 births
1956 deaths
Major League Baseball outfielders
Cleveland Naps players
Portland Beavers players
Baseball players from Colorado
Portland Beavers managers
Pueblo Indians players
Salt Lake City Bees players
Sacramento Senators players
Sacramento Solons managers
Spokane Indians managers